Protein 4.1, also known as Beatty's Protein, is a protein associated with the cytoskeleton that in humans is encoded by the EPB41 gene. Protein 4.1 is a major structural element of the erythrocyte membrane skeleton. It plays a key role in regulating membrane physical properties of mechanical stability and deformability by stabilizing spectrin-actin interaction. Protein 4.1 (80 kD) interacts with spectrin and short actin filaments to form the erythrocyte membrane skeleton. Mutations of spectrin and protein 4.1 are associated with elliptocytosis or spherocytosis and anemia of varying severity.

Clinical significance 

Elliptocytosis is a hematologic disorder characterized by elliptically shaped erythrocytes and a variable degree of hemolytic anemia. Inherited as an autosomal dominant, elliptocytosis results from mutation in any one of several genes encoding proteins of the red cell membrane skeleton. The form discussed here is the one found in the 1950s to be linked to Rh blood group and more recently shown to be caused by a defect in protein 4.1. 'Rh-unlinked' forms of elliptocytosis are caused by mutation in the alpha-spectrin gene (MIM 182860), the beta-spectrin gene (MIM 182870), or the band 3 gene (MIM 109270) [supplied by OMIM].

Interactions
Band 4.1 has been shown to interact with:
 CENPJ,
 EIF3G 
 NUMA1,  and
 TJP2.

See also
 Elliptocytosis

References

Further reading

External links